Mount Lewis is a 12,350-foot-elevation (3,764 meter) mountain summit located along the crest of the Sierra Nevada mountain range, in Mono County of northern California, United States. It is situated in the Ansel Adams Wilderness, on land managed by Inyo National Forest. The summit lies less than one mile outside of Yosemite National Park's eastern boundary, and some of the lower western slope lies within the park.

Etymology

The mountain is named in memory of Washington Bartlett "Dusty" Lewis (1884–1930), Superintendent of Yosemite National Park for 11 years from 1917 through 1928. He played a leading part in the development of the park and in standardizing uniforms for National Park Service employees. This geographical feature's name was officially adopted in 1930 by the U.S. Board on Geographic Names. Prior to 1930 this landform was known as Johnson Peak.

Climate
According to the Köppen climate classification system, Mount Lewis is located in an alpine climate zone. Most weather fronts originate in the Pacific Ocean, and travel east toward the Sierra Nevada mountains. As fronts approach, they are forced upward by the peaks (orographic lift), causing them to drop their moisture in the form of rain or snowfall onto the range. Precipitation runoff from this mountain drains into headwaters of Parker and Walker Creeks, both of which are tributaries of Rush Creek, which empties into Mono Lake.

Gallery

See also
 
 Geology of the Yosemite area

References

External links
 Weather forecast: Mount Lewis
 Mt. Lewis (photo): Flickr

Mountains of Mono County, California
Mountains of the Ansel Adams Wilderness
North American 3000 m summits
Mountains of Northern California
Sierra Nevada (United States)
Inyo National Forest